Groupe Scolaire Maïmonide Rambam, named for the medieval philosopher Maimonides, is a Jewish private school in Boulogne-Billancourt, France, in the Paris metropolitan area. It serves levels maternelle (preschool) until lycée (senior high school).

It was established as Ecole Maïmonide in 1935. In 1939 it closed as a result of World War II but reopened in 1944 after the Nazi-established ban on Jewish institutions was lifted.

References

External links
 Groupe Scolaire Maïmonide Rambam 

Lycées in Hauts-de-Seine
Schools in Hauts-de-Seine
Secondary schools in France
1935 establishments in France
Educational institutions established in 1935